The 1962 Bolivian Primera División, the first division of Bolivian football (soccer), was played by 8 teams. The champion was Chaco Petrolero.

League table

Title play-off

External links
 Official website of the LFPB 

Bolivian Primera División seasons
Bolivia
1962 in Bolivian sport